Joseph Alberic Twisleton-Wykeham-Fiennes (born 1970), known as Joseph Fiennes,  is an English actor of film, stage, and television. Journalist Zoe Williams observed that "he seemed to be the go-to actor for English cultural history". Fiennes is particularly known for his versatility and period pieces. His numerous accolades include one Screen Actors Guild Award and nomination for a British Academy Film Award.

He is known for his portrayals of William Shakespeare in Shakespeare in Love (1998), for which he was nominated for the BAFTA Award for Best Actor in a Leading Role and the Screen Actors Guild Award for Outstanding Performance by a Male Actor in a Leading Role, Sir Robert Dudley in Elizabeth (1998), Commisar Danilov in Enemy at the Gates (2001), Martin Luther in Luther (2003), and Monsignor Timothy Howard in the second season of the TV series American Horror Story (2012–2013). His performance as Commander Fred Waterford in the TV series The Handmaid's Tale (2017–2021) was nominated for the Primetime Emmy Award for Outstanding Supporting Actor in a Drama Series in 2018.

Early life and family 

Fiennes was born in 1970 in Salisbury, Wiltshire, England, the son of Mark Fiennes (1933–2004), a farmer and photographer, and Jennifer Lash (1938–1993), a writer. He has pan-British Isles ancestry.

His siblings are actor Ralph Fiennes; directors Martha Fiennes and Sophie Fiennes; composer Magnus Fiennes; and conservationist Jacob Fiennes, Joseph's twin brother. His foster brother, Michael Emery, is an archaeologist. His nephew Hero Fiennes-Tiffin played Tom Riddle, young Lord Voldemort in Harry Potter and the Half-Blood Prince. His cousin is Sir Ranulph (Ran) Fiennes, a decorated English explorer.

Education 
Fiennes was briefly educated in the Republic of Ireland, then at Swan School For Boys (now known as Leehurst Swan School, following a merger with another school), an independent school in Salisbury, before passing his 11+ exam and continuing to Bishop Wordsworth's School, a voluntary-aided state day grammar school, in the Cathedral Close of the city. He then attended art school in Suffolk for a year, before joining the Young Vic Youth Theatre. Fiennes subsequently trained for three years at London's Guildhall School of Music and Drama, graduating in 1993.

Career

Stage and film 

Fiennes' first professional stage appearance was in the West End in The Woman in Black, followed by A Month in the Country. He then became a member of the Royal Shakespeare Company for two seasons.

He made his television debut as Willy in the 1995 television film adaptation of The Vacillations of Poppy Carew. His first feature film was 1996's Stealing Beauty. In 1998, Fiennes appeared in two films that were nominated at the Academy Awards: he played Robert Dudley in Elizabeth and he portrayed William Shakespeare in Shakespeare in Love, receiving nominations for the BAFTA Award for Best Actor in a Leading Role and the Screen Actors Guild Award for Outstanding Performance by a Male Actor in a Leading Role. He appeared in Running with Scissors (2006).

In 2001, Fiennes appeared in the film Enemy at the Gates. In 2002, he starred in the independent film, Killing Me Softly.

In 2003, he lent his voice as Proteus in the DreamWorks animated film Sinbad: Legend of the Seven Seas opposite Brad Pitt. The same year, he starred in the limited-release film Luther, playing Martin Luther, and he also appeared in The Merchant of Venice, in which he portrayed Bassanio. Fiennes returned to the theatre in 2006 to perform in the one-man play Unicorns, Almost about World War II poet Keith Douglas at the Old Vic.

In 2006, he appeared in the films The Darwin Awards and Goodbye Bafana. Goodbye Bafana. Fiennes portrayed James Gregory, author of the book Goodbye Bafana: Nelson Mandela, My Prisoner, My Friend.

Television 
Fiennes starred in the ABC science fiction series FlashForward, which debuted on 24 September 2009 and ran through 27 May 2010, as Mark Benford. He starred in Starz's 10-part series, Camelot, as the wizard Merlin.

In the second season of American Horror Story, which premiered in October 2012, Fiennes played the role of Monsignor Timothy Howard. From 2017 to 2021, Fiennes started on the Hulu series The Handmaid's Tale as Commander Fred Waterford.

Personal life 
In August 2009 Fiennes married María Dolores Diéguez, a Swiss model of Spanish/Galician origin, in a Roman Catholic ceremony in Tuscany. They have two daughters named Sam and Isabel. The family reside in Mallorca, Spain near Palma.

Charity work
Fiennes was one of the celebrities to design and sign his own card for the UK-based charity Thomas Coram Foundation for Children. The cards were auctioned off on eBay in May 2014.

Filmography

Films

Television 

† released in U.S. as Egypt with the World's Greatest Explorer by the National Geographic.

Plays 
The Woman in Black, Fortune Theatre London (1993)
A Month in the Country, Belyaev, Guildford, Richmond and the Albery Theatre London (1994)
A View from the Bridge, Rodolpho, Guildford, Bristol Old Vic, Strand Theatre London (1995)
Son Of Man, Jesus Christ, Royal Shakespeare Company, London (1996)||(1997)
Les Enfants du Paradis, Lacenaire, Royal Shakespeare Company, London (1996)
Troilus and Cressida, Troilus, Royal Shakespeare Company, Stratford Upon Avon and London (1996)||(1997)
The Herbal Bed, Rafe Smith, Royal Shakespeare Company, Stratford Upon Avon and London (1996)||(1997)
As You Like It, Silvius, Royal Shakespeare Company, London (1997)
Real Classy Affair, Billy, Royal Court Theatre Company, London (1998)
Christopher Marlowe's Edward II, Edward II, Crucible Theatre, Sheffield (2001)
War Poet's Reading, Apollo Theatre (2001)
Othello, Iago, West End, London (2002)
Love's Labour's Lost, Berowne, Royal National Theatre, London (2003)
Epitaph for George Dillon, George Dillon, Royal National Theatre, London (2005)||(2006)
2,000 Feet Away, Deputy, Bush Theatre, London (2008)
Cyrano de Bergerac, Cyrano, Chichester Festival Theatre (2009)
Ross, T. E. Lawrence, Chichester Festival Theatre (2016)

Other projects and contributions 
 2002 – contributed to the compilation album, When Love Speaks, which consists of Shakespearean sonnets and play excerpts – "Be not afeard, the isle is full of noises" and "Our revels are now ended" (both from The Tempest)
 2010 – starred in a series of readings of literary love scenes for The Carte Noire Readers.
 Joseph Fiennes reads Presumed Innocent by Scott Turow
 Joseph Fiennes reads The Brightest Star in the Sky by Marian Keyes

Awards and nominations

Notes

References

External links 

Joseph Fiennes in Angola BBC News

Living people
20th-century English male actors
21st-century English male actors
Alumni of the Guildhall School of Music and Drama
English expatriates in Spain
English male film actors
English male radio actors
English male Shakespearean actors
English male stage actors
English male television actors
English male voice actors
English people of Scottish descent
English people of Irish descent
Joseph
Male actors from Wiltshire
Outstanding Performance by a Cast in a Motion Picture Screen Actors Guild Award winners
People from Salisbury
Royal Shakespeare Company members
Year of birth missing (living people)